Kiselnitsa is a rural locality (a village) in Lavrovskoye Rural Settlement, Sudogodsky District, Vladimir Oblast, Russia. The population was 12 as of 2010.

Geography 
Kiselnitsa is located on the Klyazma River, 30 km north of Sudogda (the district's administrative centre) by road. Trofimovka is the nearest rural locality.

References 

Rural localities in Sudogodsky District